Nikola Šarčević (Serbian Cyrillic: Никола Шарчевић; born 9 July 1974, Örebro) is a Swedish musician of Serbian origin. He is the bassist, vocalist, and primary songwriter for the Swedish punk rock band Millencolin and also has a solo career with 4 studio albums. He also runs the Swedish brewery Duckpond Brewing.

Biography
His first band was Seigmenn. Lock-Sport-Krock was Šarčević's first solo album. The title comes from the name of an imaginary football team that he and his brother pretended to play in when they were young. His solo work is mostly composed of folk rock and country music. On 20 April 2003, the band cancelled their US Tour after Nikola reported the disappearance of his brother, Miodrag Šarčević. Miodrag was found, deceased, four years later. It is believed a few Millencolin songs such as “Happiness For Dogs” and “Farewell My Hell” were written about him.

Nikola was listed as one of the "World's Sexiest Vegetarians" in 2008 and 2009, despite the fact that Nikola claims he is not a vegetarian. Šarčević's second solo album, Roll Roll and Flee, was released on 23 October 2006.

On 2 December 2009, Šarčević announced on his official Facebook page that he would release his third solo record "Nikola & Fattiglapparna" in 2010. The 11-song album was his first release to be recorded entirely in Swedish. In 2010 it was released through his own label Stalemate Music.

He lives in Gothenburg with his wife Lisa, and three daughters.

Discography

Seigmenn

Records

Millencolin
For his recordings with Millencolin, see Millencolin Discography

Solo career

Studio albums

Singles

References

External links
Millencolin profile & MP3s, altsounds.com
Nikola Šarčević profile, Punk76.com; accessed 8 December 2015. 
Nikola Šarčević on Fabchannel.com full length concert recording (29 November 2006)

1974 births
Living people
Swedish punk rock musicians
Swedish people of Serbian descent
English-language singers from Sweden
21st-century Swedish singers
21st-century Swedish male singers